"La venda" is a song performed by Spanish singer Miki and written by Adrià Salas, who is the lead vocalist of the Latin Grammy-nominated band La Pegatina. The song represented Spain in the Eurovision Song Contest 2019 in Tel Aviv. It finished in 22nd place with 54 points.

Eurovision Song Contest

On 14 September 2018, the Spanish broadcaster Televisión Española (TVE) confirmed that they would use the music reality program Operación Triunfo to select their act for the Eurovision Song Contest 2019. Interested and invited songwriters were able to submit their song demos from 1 November 2018 to 15 November 2018. Seventeen selected songs (via the public call and via invitation) were allocated by the talent show's boarding academy's staff to thirteen of the sixteen eligible contestants from Operación Triunfo 2018 in solo and duet combinations. The allocation was announced on 11 December 2018. The contestants recorded a one-minute demo of their respective songs. The demos were made available to the public via TVE's official website on the night between 19 December 2018 and 20 December 2018, during the finale of Operación Triunfo 2018 when the regular winner of the season was determined. An online public vote ran until 2 January 2019, enabling each user to vote for their three favorite entries each day. The three entries with the most votes advanced to the special live show "Gala Eurovisión", the special live show where the Spanish public would choose both the song and its performers for the Eurovision Song Contest on 20 January 2019. A five-member evaluation committee — consisting of two members representing TVE's management, a member from the digital branch of TVE, and two teachers from Operación Triunfo'''s boarding academy — selected seven additional entries from the fourteen remaining songs, "La venda" among them, for "Gala Eurovisión." During "Gala Eurovisión", "La venda" won with 34% of the public vote.

As Spain is a member of the "Big Five", the song automatically advanced to the final, which was held on 18 May 2019 in Tel Aviv, Israel. It finished in 22nd place with 54 points: 1 from the professional juries and 53 from the televote.

Live performances
Miki performed the song live for the first time on Gala Eurovisión of Operación Triunfo 2018 on 20 January 2019, where he was selected to represent Spain at the Eurovision Song Contest 2019.

Miki performed the song live during the final of the Eurovision Song Contest 2019 at the Expo Tel Aviv in Tel Aviv, Israel on 18 May 2019.

Music video
The official video of the song, directed by Adrià Pujol and Fèlix Cortés, was filmed on 13 February 2019 at the Mercantic antique market in Sant Cugat del Vallès and was released on 7 March 2019.

Critical response
Judy Cantor-Navas of Billboard'' described "La venda" as a "rousing party anthem, the kind of popular Spanish song that typically animates both soccer stadiums and neighborhood festivals" and as a Eurovision entry that "will please the crowd" rather than "depend on the artist's vocal talent to wow the judges and audience voters".

Track listing

Charts

Release history

References

2019 songs
Eurovision songs of 2019
Eurovision songs of Spain
Miki Núñez songs
Universal Music Spain singles